Henry the Lion (1129/1131 – 6 August 1195) was a member of the Welf dynasty who ruled as the duke of Saxony and Bavaria from 1142 and 1156, respectively, until 1180.

Henry was one of the most powerful German princes of his time, until the rival Hohenstaufen dynasty succeeded in isolating him and eventually deprived him of his duchies of Bavaria and Saxony during the reign of Emperor Frederick Barbarossa and of Frederick's son and successor Henry VI.

At the height of his reign, Henry ruled over a vast territory stretching from the coast of the North and Baltic seas to the Alps, and from Westphalia to Pomerania. Henry achieved this great power in part by his political and military acumen and in part through the legacies of his four grandparents.

Family background
Born in Ravensburg, in 1129 or 1131, he was the son of Henry the Proud, duke of Bavaria and Saxony, who was the heir of the Billungs, former dukes of Saxony. Henry's mother was Gertrude, only daughter of Emperor Lothair II and Empress Richenza, heiress of the Saxon territories of Northeim and the properties of the Brunones, counts of Brunswick.

Henry's father died in 1139, aged 32, when Henry was still a child. King Conrad III had dispossessed Henry the Proud of his duchies in 1138 and 1139, handing Saxony to Albert the Bear and Bavaria to Leopold of Austria. This was because Henry the Proud had been his rival for the Crown in 1138.

Rule

Henry the Lion did not relinquish his claims to his inheritance, and Conrad returned Saxony to him in 1142. A participant in the 1147 Wendish Crusade, Henry also reacquired Bavaria by a decision of the new emperor, Frederick Barbarossa, in 1156. However, the East Mark was not returned and became the Duchy of Austria.

Henry was the founder of Munich (1157) and Lübeck (1159); he also founded and developed numerous other cities in Northern Germany and Bavaria, a.o. Augsburg, Hildesheim, Stade, Kassel, Güstrow, Lüneburg, Salzwedel, Schwerin and Brunswick. In Brunswick, his capital, he had a bronze lion, his heraldic animal, erected in the courtyard of his castle Dankwarderode in 1166—the first bronze statue north of the Alps. Later, he had Brunswick Cathedral built close to the statue.

In 1147, Henry married Clementia of Zähringen, thereby gaining her hereditary territories in Swabia. He divorced her in 1162, apparently under pressure from Emperor Frederick Barbarossa, who did not cherish Guelphish possessions in his home area and offered Henry several fortresses in Saxony in exchange. In 1168, Henry married Matilda (1156–1189), the daughter of King Henry II of England and Duchess Eleanor of Aquitaine, and sister of King Richard I of England.

Henry faithfully supported Emperor Frederick in his attempts to solidify his hold on the Imperial Crown and his repeated wars with the cities of Lombardy and the popes, several times turning the tide of battle in Frederick's favor with his Saxon knights. During Frederick's first invasion of northern Italy, Henry took part, among the others, in the victorious sieges of Crema and Milan.

In 1172, Henry took a pilgrimage to Jerusalem (June–July), meeting with the Knights Templar and Knights Hospitaller, and spending Easter of that year in Constantinople. By December 1172, he was back in Bavaria and, in 1174, he refused to aid Frederick in a renewed invasion of Lombardy because he was preoccupied with securing his own borders in the east. He did not consider these Italian adventures worth the effort, unless Barbarossa presented Henry with the Saxon imperial city Goslar: a request Barbarossa refused.

Fall

Barbarossa's expedition into Lombardy ultimately ended in failure. He bitterly resented Henry for failing to support him. Taking advantage of the hostility of other German princes to Henry, who had successfully established a powerful and contiguous state comprising Saxony, Bavaria and substantial territories in the north and east of Germany, Frederick had Henry tried in absentia for insubordination by a court of bishops and princes in 1180. 

Declaring that Imperial law overruled traditional German law, the court had Henry stripped of his lands and declared him an outlaw. Frederick then invaded Saxony with an Imperial army to bring Henry to his knees. Henry's allies deserted him, and he finally had to submit in November 1181 at an Imperial Diet in Erfurt. He was exiled from Germany in 1182 for three years, and stayed with his father-in-law in Normandy before being allowed back into Germany in 1185. At Whitsun 1184, he visited the Diet of Pentecost in Mainz, probably as a mediator for his father-in-law Henry II. He was exiled again in 1188. His wife Matilda died in 1189.

When Frederick Barbarossa went on the Crusade of 1189, Henry returned to Saxony, mobilized an army of his faithful, and conquered the rich city of Bardowick as punishment for its disloyalty. Only the churches were left standing. Barbarossa's son, Emperor Henry VI, again defeated Duke Henry, but in 1194, with his end approaching, he made his peace with the Emperor, and returned to his much diminished lands around Brunswick, where he peacefully sponsored arts and architecture.

Children
By his first wife, Clementia of Zähringen (divorced 1162), daughter of Duke Conrad I of Zähringen and Clemence of Namur, Henry had:
Gertrude (1155–1197), who married first Duke Frederick IV of Swabia and then King Canute VI of Denmark.
Richenza (c. 1157 – 1167)
Henry, who died young

By his second wife, Matilda (married 1168), daughter of King Henry II of England and Duchess Eleanor of Aquitaine:
Matilda (or Richenza) (1172–1204), who married first Count Geoffrey III of Perche and then Lord Enguerrand III of Coucy.
Henry V, Count Palatine of the Rhine (c. 1173 – 1227)
Lothar (c. 1174 – 1190)
Otto IV, Holy Roman Emperor and Duke of Swabia (c. 1175 – 1218)
William of Winchester, Lord of Lüneburg (1184–1213)

Three other children are listed, by some sources, as having belonged to Henry and Matilda:
Eleanor (born 1178); died young
Ingibiorg (born 1180); died young
Son (b. & d. 1182)

By his lover, Ida von Blieskastel, he had a daughter, Matilda, who married Lord Henry Borwin I of Mecklenburg.

Legacy
The Henry the Lion Bible is preserved in near-mint condition from the year 1170; it is located in the Herzog August Library in Wolfenbüttel, a town in Lower Saxony.

Henry the Lion remains a popular figure to this day. During World War I, a nail man depicting Henry the Lion, called Eiserner Heinrich, was used in Brunswick to raise funds for the German war effort.

Nazi propaganda later declared Henry an antecessor of the Nazi's Lebensraum policy and turned Brunswick Cathedral and Henry's tomb into a "National Place of Consecration".

Folklore and fiction

Shortly after his death, Henry the Lion became the subject of a folktale, the so-called Heinrichssage. The tale was later also turned into the opera Enrico Leone by Italian composer Agostino Steffani. The Heinrichssage details a fictional account of Henry's pilgrimage to the Holy Land. A popular part of the tale deals with the Brunswick Lion. According to legend, Henry witnessed a fight between a lion and a dragon while on pilgrimage. He joins the lion in its fight and they slay the dragon. The faithful lion then accompanies Henry on his return home. After its master's death, the lion refuses all food and dies of grief on Henry's grave. The people of Brunswick then erect a statue in the lion's honour. The legend of Henry the Lion also inspired the Czech tale of the knight Bruncvík, which is depicted on a column on Charles Bridge in Prague.

The book The Pope's Rhinoceros (1996) by Lawrence Norfolk opens with an allegory of a planned ransack by Henry's army of the monastery at Usedom where purportedly a treasure was kept. However, the night before the attack the poorly maintained monastery and its treasures crumble into the sea as the result of a storm, and henceforth constituting a loss to the military expedition.

Notes

References

Sources

External links

 Henry the Lion on Encyclopedia.com
 Henry the Lion. The Columbia Encyclopedia, Sixth Edition
 The fall of Henry the Lion (from Germany) – Encyclopædia Britannica
 Deposition of Henry the Lion. (from Frederick I) – Encyclopædia Britannica
  MSN Encarta – Multimedia – Henry the Lion (Archived 2009-10-31)
 Charter given by Henry to monastery Volkenroda, 31.1.1174. Photograph taken from the collections of the Lichtbildarchiv älterer Originalurkunden at Marburg University showing Henry's seal.

12th-century births
1195 deaths
12th-century dukes of Bavaria
People from Ravensburg (district)
Henry 03
House of Welf
Medieval child monarchs
Christians of the Wendish Crusade
12th-century Saxon people
Military personnel from Baden-Württemberg
Burials at Brunswick Cathedral